Jeam Kelly Sroyer (born 11 December 2002) is an Indonesian professional footballer who plays as a forward for Liga 1 club Persik Kediri.

Club career

PSBS Biak
In 2021, Sroyer signed a contract with Indonesian Liga 2 club PSBS Biak. He made his league debut on 7 October 2021 in a match against Mitra Kukar at the Tuah Pahoe Stadium, Palangka Raya. On 3 November, Sroyer scored his first league goal in the 2021 Liga 2 for PSBS Biak in a 2–1 victory over Mitra Kukar.

Persik Kediri
He was signed for Persik Kediri to play in Liga 1 in the 2021 season. Sroyer made his professional debut on 8 January 2022 in a match against Borneo as a substitute for Antoni Nugroho in the 90th minute at the Kapten I Wayan Dipta Stadium, Gianyar. On 5 March, Sroyer scored his first league goal in 87th minute and saved Persik Kediri from losing to Madura United. score draw 2–2.

Career statistics

Club

Notes

References

External links
 Jeam Kelly Sroyer at Soccerway
 Jeam Kelly Sroyer at Liga Indonesia

2002 births
People from Biak Numfor Regency
Living people
Indonesian footballers
Liga 2 (Indonesia) players
Liga 1 (Indonesia) players
PSBS Biak Numfor players
Persik Kediri players
Association football forwards
Sportspeople from Papua